American civil religion is a sociological theory that a nonsectarian quasi-religious faith exists within the United States with sacred symbols drawn from national history. Scholars have portrayed it as a cohesive force, a common set of values that foster social and cultural integration. The ritualistic elements of ceremonial deism found in American ceremonies and presidential invocations of God can be seen as expressions of the American civil religion. The very heavy emphasis on pan-Christian religious themes is quite distinctively American and the theory is designed to explain this.

The concept goes back to the 19th century but the current form of this theory was developed by sociologist Robert Bellah in 1967 in the article, "Civil Religion in America". According to Bellah, Americans embrace a common civil religion with certain fundamental beliefs, values, holidays, and rituals in parallel to, or independent of, their chosen religion.

Bellah's article soon became the major focus at religious sociology conferences and numerous articles and books were written on the subject. The debate reached its peak with the American Bicentennial celebration in 1976.

Theory
Bellah posits that Americans have come to see the document of the United States Constitution, along with the Declaration of Independence and the Bill of Rights, as cornerstones of a type of civil religion or political religion. Political sociologist Anthony Squiers argues that these texts act as the sacred writ of the American civil religion because they are used as authoritative symbols in what he calls the politics of the sacred. The politics of the sacred, according to Squiers, are "the attempt to define and dictate what is in accord with the civil religious sacred and what is not. It is a battle to define what can and cannot be and what should and should not be tolerated and accepted in the community, based on its relation to that which is sacred for that community."

The nation provides quasi-religious central roles to its presidents and honors to its martyrs, such as Abraham Lincoln and the soldiers killed in the American Civil War. Historians have noted presidential level use of civil religion rhetoric in profoundly moving episodes such as World War II, the Civil Rights Movement, and the September 11 attacks.

Fourteen tenets
In a survey of more than fifty years of American civil religion scholarship, Squiers identifies fourteen principal tenets:

 Filial piety
 Reverence to certain sacred texts and symbols such as the Constitution, the Declaration of Independence, and the flag
 The sanctity of American institutions 
 The belief in God or a deity
 The idea that rights are divinely given
 The notion that freedom comes from God through government
 Governmental authority comes from God or a higher transcendent authority 
 The conviction that God can be known through the American experience
 God is the supreme judge
 God is sovereign 
 America's prosperity results from God's providence 
 America is a "city on a hill" or a beacon of hope and righteousness 
 The principle of sacrificial death and rebirth 
 America serves a higher purpose than self-interests

He further found that there are no statistically significant differences in the amount of American civil religious language between Democrats and Republicans, incumbents and non-incumbents nor Presidential and Vice-Presidential candidates.

This belief system has historically been used to reject nonconformist ideas and groups. Theorists such as Bellah hold that American civil religion can perform the religious functions of integration, legitimation, and prophecy, and other theorists, such as Richard Fenn, disagree.

Development

Alexis de Tocqueville believed that Christianity was the source of the basic principles of liberal democracy, and the only religion capable of maintaining liberty in a democratic era. He was keenly aware of the mutual hatred between Christians and liberals in 19th-century France, rooted in the Enlightenment and the French Revolution. In France, Christianity was allied with the Old Regime before 1789 and the reactionary Bourbon Restoration of 1815–1830. However he said Christianity was not antagonistic to democracy in the United States, where it was a bulwark against dangerous tendencies toward individualism and materialism, which would lead to atheism and tyranny.

Also important were the contributions of French philosopher Jean-Jacques Rousseau and French sociologist Émile Durkheim.

The American case
Most students of American civil religion follow the basic interpretation by Bellah and Durkheim. Other sources of this idea include these: philosopher John Dewey who spoke of "common faith" (1934); sociologist Robin Murphy Williams's American Society: A Sociological Interpretation (1951) which describes a "common religion" in America; sociologist Lloyd Warner's analysis of the Memorial Day celebrations in "Yankee City" (1953 [1974]); historian Martin Marty's "religion in general" (1959); theologian Will Herberg who spoke of "the American Way of Life" (1960, 1974); historian Sidney Mead's "religion of the Republic" (1963); and British writer G. K. Chesterton, who said that the United States was "the only nation ... founded on a creed" and also coined the phrase "a nation with a soul of a church".

In the same period, several distinguished historians such as Yehoshua Arieli, Daniel Boorstin, and Ralph Gabriel "assessed the religious dimension of 'nationalism', the 'American creed', 'cultural religion', and the 'democratic faith.

Premier sociologist Seymour Lipset (1963) referred to "Americanism" and the "American Creed" to characterize a distinct set of values that Americans hold with a quasi-religious fervor.

Today, according to social scientist Ronald Wimberley and William Swatos, there seems to be a firm consensus among social scientists that there is a part of Americanism that is especially religious in nature, which may be termed civil religion. But this religious nature is less significant than the "transcendent universal religion of the nation" which late eighteenth century French intellectuals such as Jean-Jacques Rousseau and Alexis de Tocqueville wrote about.

Evidence supporting Bellah
Ronald Wimberley (1976) and other researchers collected large surveys and factor analytic studies which gave support to Bellah's argument that civil religion is a distinct cultural phenomenon within American society which is not embodied in American politics or denominational religion.

Examples of civil religious beliefs are reflected in statements used in the research such as the following:
 "America is God's chosen nation today."
 "A president's authority ... is from God."
 "Social justice cannot only be based on laws; it must also come from religion."
 "God can be known through the experiences of the American people."
 "Holidays like the Fourth of July are religious as well as patriotic."
 "God Bless America"

Later research sought to determine who is civil religious. In a 1978 study by James Christenson and Ronald Wimberley, the researchers found that a wide cross section of American citizens have civil religious beliefs. In general though, college graduates and political or religious liberals appear to be somewhat less civil religious. Protestants and Catholics have the same level of civil religiosity. Religions that were created in the United States, the Latter Day Saints movement, Adventists, and Pentecostals, have the highest civil religiosity. Jews, Unitarians, and those with no religious preference have the lowest civil religion. Even though there is variation in the scores, the "great majority" of Americans are found to share the types of civil religious beliefs which Bellah wrote about.

Further research found that civil religion plays a role in people's preferences for political candidates and policy positions. In 1980 Ronald Wimberley found that civil religious beliefs were more important than loyalties to a political party in predicting support for Nixon over McGovern with a sample of Sunday morning church goers who were surveyed near the election date and a general group of residents in the same community. In 1982 James Christenson and Ronald Wimberley found that civil religion was second only to occupation in predicting a person's political policy views.

Coleman has argued that civil religion is a widespread theme in history. He says it typically evolves in three phases: undifferentiation, state sponsorship in the period of modernization, differentiation. He supports his argument with comparative historical data from Japan, Imperial Rome, the Soviet Union, Turkey, France, and the United States.

In practice

American Revolution

The American Revolution is the main source of civil religion. The book Sons of the Fathers: The Civil Religion of the American Revolution says it produced these religious properties: a Moses-like leader in George Washington; prophets such as Thomas Jefferson and Thomas Paine; apostles such as John Adams and Benjamin Franklin; martyrs such as at the Boston Massacre and in Nathan Hale; devils such as Benedict Arnold and Hessian "mercenaries"; sacred places such as Independence Hall and Valley Forge; rituals such as raising the Liberty Pole; symbols such as the Betsy Ross flag; sacred holidays such as Independence Day; and a holy scripture based on the Declaration of Independence, Constitution, and the Bill of Rights.

Ceremonies in the early Republic
The leaders of the Federalist Party were conscious of the need to boost voter identification with their party. Elections remained of central importance but for the rest of the political year, celebrations, parades, festivals, and visual sensationalism were used. They employed multiple festivities, exciting parades, and even quasi-religious pilgrimages and "sacred" days that became incorporated into the American civil religion. George Washington was always its hero, and after his death he became a sort of demigod looking down from heaven to instill his blessings on the party.

At first the Federalists focused on commemoration of the ratification of the Constitution; they organized parades to demonstrate widespread popular support for the new Federalist Party. The parade organizers incorporated secular versions of traditional religious themes and rituals, thereby fostering a highly visible celebration of the nation's new civil religion.

The Fourth of July has been a semi-sacred day since then. Its celebration in Boston proclaimed national over local patriotism, and included orations, dinners, militia musters, parades, marching bands, floats, and fireworks. By 1800, the Fourth was closely identified with the Federalist party. Republicans were annoyed, and staged their own celebrations on the Fourth—with rival parades sometimes clashing with each other. That generated even more excitement and larger crowds. After the collapse of the Federalists starting in 1815, the Fourth became a nonpartisan holiday.

President as religious leader
Since George Washington, presidents have assumed various roles in American civil religion, which has shaped the presidency. Linder argues that:

Charles W. Calhoun argues that in the 1880s, the speeches of Benjamin Harrison display a rhetorical style that embraced American civic religion; indeed, Harrison was one of the credo's most adept presidential practitioners. Harrison was a leader whose application of Christian ethics to social and economic matters paved the way for the Social Gospel, the Progressive Movement, and a national climate of acceptance regarding government action to resolve social problems.

Linder argues that President Bill Clinton's sense of civil religion was based on his Baptist background in Arkansas. Commentator William Safire noted of the 1992 presidential campaign that "Never has the name of God been so frequently invoked, and never has this or any nation been so thoroughly and systematically blessed." Clinton's speeches incorporated religious terminology that suggests the role of pastor rather than prophet or priest. With a universalistic outlook, he made no sharp distinction between the domestic and the foreign in presenting his vision of a world community of civil faith.

Brocker argues that Europeans have often mischaracterized the politics of President George W. Bush (2001–2009) as directly inspired by Protestant fundamentalism. However, in his speeches Bush mostly actually used civil religious metaphors and images and rarely used language specific to any Christian denomination. His foreign policy, says Bocker, was based on American security interests and not on any fundamentalist teachings.

Hammer says that in his 2008 campaign speeches candidate Barack Obama portrays the American nation as a people unified by a shared belief in the American Creed and sanctified by the symbolism of an American civil religion.

Would-be presidents likewise contributed to the rhetorical history of civil religion. The speeches of Daniel Webster were often memorized by student debaters, and his 1830 endorsement of "Liberty and Union, now and forever, one and inseparable" was iconic.

Symbolism of the American flag
According to Adam Goodheart, the modern meaning of the American flag, and the reverence of many Americans towards it, was forged by Major Robert Anderson's fight in defense of the flag at the Battle of Fort Sumter, which opened the American Civil War in April 1861. During the war the flag was used throughout the Union to symbolize American nationalism and rejection of secessionism. Goodheart explains the flag was transformed into a sacred symbol of patriotism:

Soldiers and veterans
An important dimension is the role of the soldiers, ready to sacrifice their lives to preserve the nation. They are memorialized in many monuments and semi-sacred days, such as Veterans Day and Memorial Day. Historian Jonathan Ebel argues that the "soldier-savior" is a sort of Messiah, who embodies the synthesis of civil religion, and the Christian ideals of sacrifice and redemption. In Europe, there are numerous cemeteries exclusively for American soldiers who fought in world wars. They have become American sacred spaces.

Pacifists have made some sharp criticisms. For example, Kelly Denton-Borhaug, writing from the Moravian peace tradition,  argues that the theme of "sacrifice" has fueled the rise of what she calls "U.S. war culture". The result is a diversion of attention from what she considers the militarism and the immoral, oppressive, sometimes barbaric conduct in the global American war on terror.

Pledge of Allegiance
Kao and Copulsky argue the concept of civil religion illuminates the popular constitutional debate over the Pledge of Allegiance. The function of the pledge has four aspects: preservationist, pluralist, priestly, and prophetic. The debate is not between those who believe in God and those who do not, but it is a dispute on the meaning and place of civil religion in America.

Cloud explores political oaths since 1787 and traces the tension between a need for national unity and a desire to affirm religious faith. He reviews major Supreme Court decisions involving the Pledge of Allegiance, including the contradictory Minersville School District v. Gobitis (1940) and West Virginia v. Barnette (1943) decisions. He argues that the Pledge was changed in 1954 during the Cold War to encourage school children to reject communism's atheistic philosophy by affirming belief in God.

School rituals
Adam Gamoran (1990) argues that civil religion in public schools can be seen in such daily rituals as the pledge of allegiance; in holiday observances, with activities such as music and art; and in the social studies, history and English curricula. Civil religion in schools plays a dual role: it socializes youth to a common set of understandings, but it also sets off subgroups of Americans whose backgrounds or beliefs prevent them from participating fully in civil religious ceremonies.

Ethnic minorities
The Bellah argument deals with mainstream beliefs, but other scholars have looked at minorities outside the mainstream, and typically distrusted or disparaged by the mainstream, which have developed their own version of U.S. civil religion.

White Southerners
Wilson, noting the historic centrality of religion in Southern identity, argues that when the White South was outside the national mainstream in the late 19th century, it created its own pervasive common civil religion heavy with mythology, ritual, and organization. Wilson says the "Lost Cause"—that is, defeat in a holy war—has left some southerners to face guilt, doubt, and the triumph of what they perceive as evil: in other words, to form a tragic sense of life.

Black and African Americans
Woodrum and Bell argue that black people demonstrate less civil religiosity than white people and that different predictors of civil religion operate among black and white people. For example, conventional religion positively influences white people's civil religion but negatively influences black people's civil religion. Woodrum and Bell interpret these results as a product of black American religious ethnogenesis and separatism. In addition, as Frederick Douglass described in his "What to the Slave Is the Fourth of July?" speech in 1852, civil religion may be more complicated for Black Americans: "The sunlight that brought life and healing to you, has brought stripes and death to me. This Fourth of July is yours, not mine. You may rejoice, I must mourn."

Japanese Americans
Iwamura argues that the pilgrimages made by Japanese Americans to the sites of World War II-era internment camps have formed a Japanese American version of civil religion. Starting in 1969 the Reverend Sentoku Maeda and Reverend Soichi Wakahiro began pilgrimages to Manzanar National Historic Site in California. These pilgrimages included poetry readings, music, cultural events, a roll call of former internees, and a nondenominational ceremony with Protestant and Buddhist ministers and Catholic and Shinto priests. The event is designed to reinforce Japanese American cultural ties and to ensure that such injustices will never occur again.

Hispanic and Latino Americans
Mexican-American labor leader César Chávez, by virtue of having holidays, stamps, and other commemorations of his actions, has practically become a "saint" in American civil religion, according to León. He was raised in the Catholic tradition and using Catholic rhetoric. His "sacred acts", his political practices couched in Christian teachings, became influential to the burgeoning Chicano movement and strengthened his appeal. By acting on his moral convictions through nonviolent means, Chávez became sanctified in the national consciousness, says León.

Enshrined texts

Christian language, rhetoric, and values helped colonists to perceive their political system as superior to the corrupt British monarchy. Ministers' sermons were instrumental in promoting patriotism and in motivating the colonists to take action against the evils and corruption of the British government. Together with the semi-religious tone sometimes adopted by preachers and such leaders as George Washington, and the notion that God favored the patriot cause, this made the documents of the Founding Fathers suitable as almost-sacred texts.

The National Archives Building in Washington preserves and displays the Declaration of Independence, the Constitution and the Bill of Rights. Pauline Maier describes these texts as enshrined in massive, bronze-framed display cases. While political scientists, sociologists, and legal scholars study the Constitution and how it is used in American society, on the other hand, historians are concerned with putting themselves back into a time and place, in context. It would be anachronistic for them to look at the documents of the "Charters of Freedom" and see America's modern "civic religion" because of "how much Americans have transformed very secular and temporal documents into sacred scriptures". The whole business of erecting a shrine for the worship of the Declaration of Independence strikes some academic critics looking from the point of view of 1776 or 1789 America as "idolatrous, and also curiously at odds with the values of the Revolution". It was suspicious of religious iconographic practices. At the beginning, in 1776, it was not meant to be that at all.

On the 1782 Great Seal of the United States, the date of the Declaration of Independence and the words under it signify the beginning of the "new American Era" on earth. Though the inscription, does not translate from the Latin as "secular", it also does not refer to a new order of heaven. It is a reference to generations of society in the western hemisphere, the millions of generations to come.

Even from the vantage point of a new nation only ten to twenty years after the drafting of the Constitution, the Framers themselves differed in their assessments of its significance. Washington in his Farewell Address pleaded that "the Constitution be sacredly maintained". He echoed Madison in Federalist no. 49 that citizen "veneration" of the Constitution might generate the intellectual stability needed to maintain even the "wisest and freest governments" amidst conflicting loyalties. But there is also a rich tradition of dissent from "Constitution worship". By 1816, Jefferson could write that "some men look at constitutions with sanctimonious reverence and deem them like the ark of the covenant, too sacred to be touched". But he saw imperfections and imagined that potentially, there could be others, believing as he did that "institutions must advance also".

Regarding the United States Constitution, the position of the Church of Jesus Christ of Latter-day Saints (LDS Church) is that it is a divinely inspired document.

Making a nation
The American identity has an ideological connection to these "Charters of Freedom". Samuel P. Huntington discusses common connections for most peoples in nation-states, a national identity as product of common ethnicity, ancestry and experience, common language, culture and religion. Levinson argues:

The creed, according to Huntington, is made up of (a) individual rights, (b) majority rule, and (c) a constitutional order of limited government power. American independence from Britain was not based on cultural difference, but on the adoption of principles found in the Declaration. Whittle Johnson in The Yale Review sees a sort of "covenanting community" of freedom under law, which, "transcending the 'natural' bonds of race, religion and class, itself takes on transcendent importance".

Becoming a naturalized citizen of the United States requires passing a test covering a basic understanding of the Declaration, the U.S. Constitution, and the Bill of Rights, and taking an oath to support the U.S. Constitution. Hans Kohn described the United States Constitution as "unlike any other: it represents the lifeblood of the American nation, its supreme symbol and manifestation. It is so intimately welded with the national existence itself that the two have become inseparable." Indeed, abolishing the Constitution in Huntington's view would abolish the United States, it would "destroy the basis of community, eliminating the nation, [effecting] ... a return to nature".

As if to emphasize the lack of any alternative "faith" to the American nation, Thomas Grey in his article "The Constitution as scripture", contrasted those traditional societies with divinely appointed rulers enjoying heavenly mandates for social cohesion with that of the United States. He pointed out that Article VI, third clause, requires all political figures, both federal and state, "be bound by oath or affirmation to support this Constitution, but no religious test shall ever be required". This was a major break not only with past British practice commingling authority of state and religion, but also with that of most American states when the Constitution was written.

Escape clause. Whatever the oversights and evils the modern reader may see in the original Constitution, the Declaration that "all men are created equal"—in their rights—informed the Constitution in such a way that Frederick Douglass in 1860 could label the Constitution, if properly understood, as an antislavery document. He held that "the constitutionality of slavery can be made out only by disregarding the plain and common-sense reading to the Constitution itself. [T]he Constitution will afford slavery no protection when it shall cease to be administered by slaveholders", a reference to the Supreme Court majority at the time. With a change of that majority, there was American precedent for judicial activism in Constitutional interpretation, including the Massachusetts Supreme Court, which had ended slavery there in 1783.

Accumulations of Amendments under Article V of the Constitution and judicial review of Congressional and state law have fundamentally altered the relationship between U.S. citizens and their governments. Some scholars refer to the coming of a "second Constitution": with the Thirteenth Amendment, all people in the United States are free; the Fourteenth, all Americans are citizens; the Fifteenth, all citizens vote regardless of race; and the Nineteenth, all citizens vote regardless of sex. The Fourteenth Amendment has been interpreted so as to require States to respect citizen rights in the same way that the Constitution has required the Federal government to respect them – so much so, that in 1972, the U.S. representative from Texas, Barbara Jordan, could affirm, "My faith in the Constitution is whole, it is complete, it is total".

After discussion of the Article V provision for change in the Constitution as a political stimulus to serious national consensus building, Sanford Levinson performed a thought experiment which was suggested at the bicentennial celebration of the Constitution in Philadelphia. If one were to sign the Constitution today, whatever our reservations might be, knowing what we do now, and transported back in time to its original shortcomings, great and small, "signing the Constitution commits one not to closure but only to a process of becoming, and to taking responsibility for the political vision toward which I, joined I hope, with others, strive".

See also

 American exceptionalism
 American's Creed
 "And I don't care what it is", Dwight Eisenhower quote from 1952
 Arlington National Cemetery
 Ceremonial deism
 Commemoration of the American Revolution
 Confucian ritual religion
 Constitutionalism
 Gettysburg Address
 Imperial cult
 Independence Hall
 Judeo-Christian ethics
 Liberty Bell
 Moralistic therapeutic deism
 Religious Confucianism
 Republicanism in the United States
 Secular Shrine Theory
 Statolatry

References

Sources

Further reading
  From the issue entitled Religion in America.
 
 
 
 
 
 Gardella, Peter, American Civil Religion: What Americans Hold Sacred (Oxford University Press, 2014), 368 pp.
 Gorski, Philip. American Covenant: A History of Civil Religion from the Puritans to the Present (Princeton University Press, 2017) excerpt
 
  Page 328 specifically talks about American civil religion, referencing Jones's book, American Civil Religion.
 
 
 McCarthy, Rockne. "Civil Religion in Early America," Fides et Historia, Summer 1975, 8#1 pp 20–40, covers 1800-1900
 Pierard, Richard V. and Robert D. Linder, "The President and Civil Religion," in Encyclopedia of the American Presidency ed. by Leonard W. Levy and Louis Fisher, (1994), I: 203-06.

 Richey, Russell E., and Donald G. Jones, eds. American Civil Religion (1974), articles by scholars
 Rouner, Leroy S. ed. Civil Religion and Political Theology (1986).
 Sassi, Jonathan D. A Republic of Righteousness: The Public Christianity of the Post-Revolutionary New England Clergy (Oxford University Press, 2001). online
 Swatos, William H. "Civil Religion," in Encyclopedia of Religion and Society (1998) online

Historiography
 Fenn, Richard K. "The Relevance of Bellah's 'Civil Religion' Thesis to a Theory of Secularization," Social Science History, Fall 1977, 1#4 pp 502–517
 Gedicks, Frederick. "American Civil Religion: an Idea Whose Time Is Past," The George Washington International Law Review Volume: 41. Issue: 4. 2010. pp 891+. online
 Lindner, Robert D. "Civil Religion in Historical Perspective: The Reality that Underlies the Concept," Journal of Church and State, Summer 1975, 17#3 pp 399–421, focus on European theorists
 McDermott, Gerald Robert. "Civil Religion in the American Revolutionary Period: An Historiographic Analysis," Christian Scholar's Review, April 1989, 18#4 pp 346–362
 Mathisen, James A.; Bellah, Robert N. "Twenty Years after Bellah: Whatever Happened to American Civil Religion?," Sociological Analysis, April 1989, 50#2, pp 129–146 online

Sociology of religion
Religion and society in the United States
American studies
Ethnocentrism
Foreign relations of the United States
Civil Religion
Religious nationalism